Giuliano Santiago Portilla Castillo (born 25 May 1972 in Lima) is a retired Peruvian footballer.

Club career
Portilla previously played for a number of clubs in Peru, including Universitario de Deportes, Cienciano and FBC Melgar.

International career
Portilla has made five appearances for the senior Peru national football team from 1997 to 2005.

Honours

Club
 Universitario de Deportes:
 Peruvian First Division: 1998, 1999, 2000
 Cienciano del Cuzco:
 Copa Sudamericana: 2003
 Recopa Sudamericana: 2004
 Torneo Apertura: 2005

References

External links

1973 births
Living people
Footballers from Lima
Association football defenders
Peruvian footballers
Peru international footballers
Peruvian Primera División players
León de Huánuco footballers
Club Universitario de Deportes footballers
FBC Melgar footballers
Cienciano footballers
Sporting Cristal footballers
Deportivo Municipal footballers
José Gálvez FBC footballers
1997 Copa América players